Bundgaard is a surname. Notable people with the surname include:

Anders Bundgaard (1864–1937), Danish sculptor
Henrik Bundgaard (born 1975), Danish football goalkeeper
Poul Bundgaard (1922–1998), Danish actor and singer
Scott Bundgaard (born 1968), American politician
Sine Bundgaard (born 1970), Danish soprano